San Domenico is a Roman Catholic basilica church, located on Piazza Giordano Bruno and via del Castellano in the city of Perugia, region of Umbria, central Italy.

Description
A church, titled the Pieve di Santo Stefano del Castellare, was present at the site since about the 5th century. Construction of the precursor to the present church, also known as San Domenico Vecchio, began in 1304, and was constructed over the pre-existing church which had become inadequate after the growth of the Dominican Order. According to Giorgio Vasari, it was designed by Giovanni Pisano That church was consecrated in 1459, and had a layout that resembled the northern-European Hallenkirche plans.

By 1614–1615, the San Domenico Vecchio church was dilapidated, showing structural problems, and threatening collapse. New plans for refurbishment were implemented. The church façade retains a late 16th-century portal and is now double Baroque staircase. The interior was renovated in 1629–1632 by Carlo Maderno, and shows similarities with Maderno's design of the nave of St Peter's in Rome, except San Domenico has small lateral windows.

Of the prior San Domenico church, some fragments remain: the cloister (1455–1579), the chapel of St Catherine, and a large Gothic rose window (21 x 8.5 m) near the choir, executed by Bartolomeo di Pietro and Mariotto di Nardo in 1411. This window is also shown in a fresco now in the Palazzo dei Priori of Perugia. The bell tower was built in 1454–1500 by the Lombard architect Gasperino di Antonio. Originally it was taller than its current appearance, but it was later reduced  for stability reasons.

Over the centuries, some of the movable artwork inside the church was removed. It still contains the 14th-century funerary monument to Pope Benedict XI, who died at Perugia in 1304 (perhaps sculpted by a pupil of Arnolfo di Cambio). It still has the altar (1459) of the Chapel of the Rosary by Agostino di Duccio and  wooden choir-stalls, dating to the late 14th century. The church once housed also the Perugia Altarpiece (Guidalotti Polyptych) by Fra Angelico, now in the Galleria Nazionale dell'Umbria. The Chapel of St Catherine has 14th and 15th-century frescoes.

The annexed cloister houses the National Archaeological Museum of Umbria, with pre-historic, Roman and Etruscan items excavated in Umbria.

References

Sources

Minor basilicas in Umbria
Domenico
Gothic architecture in Perugia
Roman Catholic churches completed in 1458
Roman Catholic churches completed in 1632
15th-century Roman Catholic church buildings in Italy
1632 establishments in Italy